Eason Retail PLC, known as Easons or Eason, is an Irish retail company best known for selling books, stationery, cards, gifts, newspapers and magazines. Headquartered in Swords, County Dublin, it is the largest supplier of books, magazines and newspapers in Ireland.

Eason employs approximately 600 people and is privately owned. Its turnover for the year ended January 2022 was €104 million.

Eason has 54 stores which trade under the main brand in the Republic of Ireland. Eason also owns the Dubray Books brand and chain of 11 specialist bookstores, having acquired Dubray in 2020. Eason’s managing Director is Liam Hanly.

Divisions 
Eason operates three business units: Eason Stores, Eason Online and Dubray.

Eason Stores

54 stores trade under the Eason brand. This includes the company's flagship store on Dublin’s O’Connell Street as well as stores in Arklow, Athlone, Balbriggan, Ballina, Ballincollig, Blanchardstown, Carlow, Castlebar, Cavan, Clare Hall, Clonmel Shopping Centre, Cork City (2), Crescent Shopping Centre (Limerick), Douglas, Dun Laoghaire, Dundalk, Dundrum, Dungarvan, Ennis, Enniscorthy, Galway Shop Street, Galway Shopping Centre, Gorey, Heuston Station, Jetland, Kilkenny, Killarney, Liffey Valley, Limerick, Listowel,   Mahon, Mallow, Maynooth, Monaghan, Mullingar, Nassau Street, Navan, Nenagh, Newbridge, Parkway, Santry, Shannon, Sligo, Sligo Quayside, Stephen’s Green, Swords, Tallaght, Thurles, Tralee, Wexford and Wilton. 

in 2019, Eason expanded its physical footprint by purchasing six stores in Kilkenny, Clonmel, Balbriggan, Maynooth and Arklow which had previously been operated under franchise agreement.,It also added three new franchise stores in Gorey, Enniscorthy and Wexford.

Eason Online

Eason's online business generated record revenues and high levels of profitability in 2021.

Dubray

Eason acquired rival bookseller Dubray in 2020. It continues to operate Dubray's chain of bookstores and online business under the Dubray brand, which specialises in book sales, as distinct from Eason's more general offering of books, newspapers, magazines, stationery and other products. In 2022, Eason opened three new Dubray stores in Dundrum (Dublin), Cork and on Dublin’s Henry Street, bringing the total number of Dubray stores to 11.

History

In 1886 Charles Eason, a manager of WHSmith wrote to the company asking if he could buy out the company. WHSmith sold its Irish section to him that year and there would not be a branch of WHSmith on any part of Ireland until 2001.

In 1913 James Larkin published a pamphlet warning the company not to stock the newspapers of William Martin Murphy during the 1913 lockout.

Originally all stores were owned and operated by Eason, but the chain began franchising with a number of new retail units operating independently under the Eason brand from the mid-2000s. In 2019, Eason acquired six of these stores and 17 of Eason stores are operated under a franchise agreement.  

Shareholders voted to approve a sale and leaseback of the companies primary owned stores in 2018 which created an independent retail business (Eason Retail PLC) and a separate entity holding shareholders’ property assets (Eason Holdings). Eason Holdings PLC entered voluntary liquidation in 2020 to facilitate a cash distribution to Eason shareholders, from the proceeds of the sale of a number of properties since late 2018.

In 2020, Eason acquired rival bookseller Dubray Books. The Dubray units retained their brand and specialise in book sales, in contrast to the Eason-branded units' general offering of books, newspapers, magazines, stationery and other items.

On 23 March 2020, the company's seven stores in Northern Ireland temporarily closed in compliance with the government restrictions imposed as a result of the Covid-19 pandemic. On 15 July 2020, the company announced that its Northern Irish stores would not reopen.

Former divisions
 British Bookshops & Sussex Stationers outlets in south-east England. In May 2009, Eason sold this company to Endless PLC. Endless intend to keep the "British Bookshops" name.
 Eason's Advertising Services Limited - a niche advertising agency which closed in 2010.
 Eason and Son (N.I.) Ltd - This division operated the chain of 15 stores in Northern Ireland.
 N.P.O. UK Ltd. (subsequently rebranded Eason) - These stores were operated under Eason and Son (N.I.) Ltd. NPO UK specialised in stationery; however, after the Eason takeover, the stores stocked the same range of products as all Eason stores.
 Eason News Distribution Division (now merged into the EM News) - was based in Dublin and outside Cork City Newsbrothers.  Newsbrothers, a subsidiary company of Eason, was responsible for newspaper and magazine distribution in the Munster region.
 Hughes & Hughes Airport - in early 2010 Hughes & Hughes entered administration, with Eason acquiring its seven airport stores, however Eason lost the tender to operate these bookshops in 2013.
EM News Distribution - Eason merged its Irish newspaper and magazine wholesale distribution businesses with John Menzies creating EM News Distribution. Menzies Distribution purchased Eason’s share in 2017.

See also

 List of Irish companies

Further reading
 Cullen, L. M. Eason & Son: A History. (Dublin, 1989). 438pp, 16 plates.

References

External links

 Official Website

1819 establishments in Ireland
Bookstores established in the 19th century
Retail companies established in 1819
Bookstores of Ireland